The Turkmenistan national ice hockey team is the national men's ice hockey team of Turkmenistan. The team is controlled by the Turkmenistan Ice Hockey Federation (TŞHF) and a member of the International Ice Hockey Federation (IIHF). Turkmenistan is currently ranked 49th in the IIHF World Ranking and made its debut in the 2018 World Championship Division III Qualification tournament.

History
The first national team formed in 2011 of four teams from Ashgabat: Oguzkhan, Alp Arslan, Shir and Burgut.

In 2013, Turkmenistan held its first (unofficial) match against Minsk City, which was won by a score of 7–2.

Turkmenistan participated at the 2017 Asian Winter Games. They won their first match in an official tournament by defeating Malaysia 9–2 and later went on to win their division by defeating Kyrgyzstan 7–3 in the gold medal game.

Turkmenistan made its World Championship debut in 2018, where it played in Division III Qualificaiton tournament in Sarajevo, Bosnia and Herzegovina. They won all three games and earned promotion to Division III for 2019.

In April 2019, Turkmenistan making their debut in the 2019 IIHF World Championship Division III in Sofia (Bulgaria) and took third place among six teams in group, achieving a historic result.

During visit to Ashgabat Russian retired ice hockey player Sergei Nemchinov from 30 August to 7 September 2019 conducted intensive training with the Turkmenistan men's national ice hockey team. Then he entered the coaching staff of the national team of Turkmenistan and has already drawn up a plan for preparing Turkmen hockey players for the 2020 IIHF World Championship Division III Group A.

Tournament record

World Championships

Asian Winter Games

List of head coaches
 Rustam Kerimov 2013–2016
 Bayram Allayarov 2016–

All-time record against other nations
Last match update: 28 April 2019

Note: Iran was disqualified from the 2017 Asian Winter Games due to a number of players were deemed ineligible in the regional games.

See also
Ice hockey in Turkmenistan

References

External links
IIHF profile
National Teams of Ice Hockey profile

 
National ice hockey teams in Asia